Victoria Sweet is an American physician, author and advocate for what is termed "slow medicine".  She is also a historian of medicine who has studied the writings of Hildegard of Bingen,  a 12th century German abbess and medical therapist.

Biography

Early life
Victoria Sweet was born in Los Angeles, California. Her ancestors came to California from Germany in 1836.

Education
As an undergraduate she studied at Stanford University, where she majored in mathematics, with a minor in the Classics.  She received her MD degree in 1977 at age 27 from the University of California Irvine School of Medicine. She received an M.A. in 1995 and a Ph.D. in 2003, both degrees in History of Health Sciences, from the University of California, San Francisco.

Work as medical historian

Sweet's doctorate study was based  on the medical treatise of Hildegard of Bingen, written in Latin, entitled Causae et Curae ("Causes and Cures").   Sweet draws special attention to Hildegard's use of the word viriditas. It comes from the Latin word for "green," and was used to refer to the color of plants, as well as meaning "vigor" and "youthfulness."   Sweet points out how Hildegard also used the word viriditas in the broader sense of the power of plants to put forth leaves and fruit, and the analogous intrinsic power of human beings to grow and to heal.  Inspired by Hildegard, Sweet began to ask herself as she was treating her patients whether anything was interfering with the viriditas or the intrinsic power to heal—to relate to healing like being a gardener who removes impediments and nourishes, in a sanctuary-like setting.

Views on medicine
During the 1990s and first decade of the 21st century, while obtaining her doctorate in medical history, Sweet was also working as an internal medicine physician at the old Laguna Honda Hospital in San Francisco. In the year 2010 a new hospital facility was built and repurposed. The old Laguna Honda Hospital was a long-term treatment and rehabilitation hospital. She describes the old hospital as being the last "almshouse" in America.

The conjunction of studying the healing philosophy of Hildegard of Bingen along with working at the old Laguna Honda Hospital helped Sweet formulate principles of what she refers to as "slow medicine". Sweet says that "sick people need time...and their doctors do too....Doctors need time to sit with their patients, to think, to read, to consult, to catch their mistakes."

Pilgrimage
Over a four-year period, Sweet walked the 1,200 mile (1,900 km) Medieval pilgrimage-trail known as the "Way of St. James" (or in Spanish, the "Camino de Santiago"), from southern France to the north-west coast of Spain. For four different years, Sweet would return to walk a 400-mile (600 km) section of the trail, in order to complete the whole trail.  While hiking the pilgrimage trail, Sweet experienced a sense of connectedness and fellow-feeling, based on mutual assistance and reciprocal compassion, which she then brought to her evolving practice of medicine.

Published works

Slow Medicine: The Way to Healing (2017), Riverhead Books (Penguin).
God's Hotel: A Doctor, a Hospital, and a Pilgrimage to the Heart of Medicine (2013), Riverhead Books (Penguin).
Rooted in the Earth, Rooted in the Sky: Hildegard of Bingen and Premodern Medicine (Studies in Medieval History and Culture) (2006), Routledge.

Honors, decorations, awards and distinctions

Guggenheim Fellowship for 2014-2015 in the category of Creative Arts, General Non-fiction

See also
Slow movement (culture)
Narrative medicine
Viriditas

References

External links
 video: Victoria Sweet TEDx talk; Aug. 15, 2013
 Transcript of talk: "Dr. Victoria Sweet on Slow Medicine: The Way to Healing" (Talks at Google); Feb. 1, 2018

Living people
American women physicians
American medical historians
Health care quality
Slow movement
People from Los Angeles
Year of birth missing (living people)
Stanford University alumni
University of California, Irvine alumni
University of California, San Francisco alumni
Historians from California
21st-century American women